Antigonish is a town in Antigonish County, Nova Scotia, Canada. The town is home to St. Francis Xavier University and the oldest continuous Highland games outside Scotland. It is approximately 160 kilometres (100 miles) northeast of Halifax, the provincial capital.

History
Antigonish had been the location of an annual Mi'kmaq summer coastal community prior to European settlement. The original definition of the name has been lost as the Mi'kmaq language has undergone many revisions over the last two centuries. The first European settlement took place in 1784 when Lt. Colonel Timothy Hierlihy of the Royal Nova Scotia Volunteer Regiment received a large land grant surrounding Antigonish Harbour. Hierlihy and his party founded the Dorchester settlement, named for Sir Guy Carleton, who was Governor General of Canada and subsequently Lord Dorchester. Shortly after, Sgt Nathan Pushee of the Duke of Cumberland's Regiment settled at Chedabucto (present-day Guysborough), eventually establishing present-day Amherst, Nova Scotia.  In 1796 another settler, with the assistance of a First Nations guide, blazed a trail from Antigonish Harbour to Brown's Mountain, using the shortest route. This trail became a guide for travellers and eventually evolved into a winding Main Street. By the late 1820s, Dorchester was commonly referred to as Antigonish. In 1852, a newspaper, The Casket, began publication.  It was recently purchased by Bounty Print in 2015.

St. Francis Xavier University was established in Antigonish in 1855, having been founded in 1853 in Arichat, Cape Breton and originally called the College of East Bay after East Bay, Nova Scotia where an earlier institution had once existed (1824–1829). St.F.X. was originally a Catholic seminary and was granted full university powers in 1866 by an act of the Nova Scotia House of Assembly. The town is also the episcopal seat of the Roman Catholic Diocese of Antigonish.

The first hospital in Antigonish opened on June 10, 1906.

Antigonish is notable for having a social movement named for it, the Antigonish Movement, launched from St. Francis Xavier University in the 1920s by local priests and educators including Moses Coady and Jimmy Tompkins.

Demographics 

Economy

Antigonish is a service centre for the surrounding region that includes Antigonish and Guysborough Counties and many local businesses are based in the service sector. There are no major industrial operations located in the town or county. The workforce is primarily white collar with the largest employers being St. Martha's Regional Hospital and St. Francis Xavier University. Until 2011, Antigonish accommodated Canada Post's National Philatelic Centre, which provided mail-order services for worldwide collectors of Canadian stamps.

Highway 104 Twinning
In 2005, the provincial government approved the twinning of Highway 104 from Addington Forks Road easterly  to Taylor's Road. In 2017, the provincial government announced that a further  from Sutherlands River to Antigonish would be twinned, thus creating an uninterrupted four-lane highway network from Halifax to Antigonish. The project is expected to be completed by the early to mid 2020s, without the creation of tolls.

2004–07 retail building boom
The Antigonish area experienced great deal of economic growth and retail development between 2004 and 2007 when the retail landscape of the town and county changed significantly. Much of the growth took place in the Post Road area, just outside town. Atlantic Superstore, Walmart, and Central (now Kent) constructed new stores while the former Atlantic SuperValue, also located in this area, was redeveloped as a Staples Business Depot.

Other areas also saw growth. In June 2005, Shoppers Drug Mart opened a new store downtown while the NSLC opened a new store attached to the existing Sobeys store, located next to mall.

A multi-unit retail annex was constructed at the local shopping mall in the spring of 2006. This complex houses a new Cleve's sporting goods store, and other businesses and services. The mall area also saw the construction of a Boston Pizza restaurant which opened in late 2006, and an A&W restaurant that opened in February 2007.

Education 

St. Francis Xavier University is located in Antigonish. St. Francis Xavier has 4,267 full-time students and 500 part-time students. It was named as the best primarily undergraduate university in Canada by Maclean's magazine for five consecutive years (2002–2006). St. Francis Xavier is also well known for the X-Ring and the Coady International Institute.

The elementary and secondary schools in Antigonish fall under the jurisdiction of the Strait Regional School Board. Antigonish is home to three public schools: Dr. John Hugh Gillis Regional High School, St. Andrew Junior School and the Antigonish Education Centre.

Sports and culture
The annual Antigonish Highland Games have been held since 1863. The first games were held to raise funds for the construction of St. Ninian's Cathedral.

Year-round, the town has access to professional and community theatre through the Bauer Theatre on the StFX Campus. It is home to Festival Antigonish Summer Theatre and Theatre Antigonish.

Notable residents
August Ames, pornographic actress
Donald Chisholm, stockcar driver
Mary-Colin Chisholm, stage, film and TV actor
Mark Day (actor), film and TV actor
Moses Coady, Catholic priest, adult educator, and leader of the Antigonish Movement
Eric Gillis, 2008, 2012, 2016 Olympian (athletics-10,000m, marathon)
Captain Nichola Goddard, MSM, fallen Canadian soldier
Tareq Hadhad, Syrian-Canadian businessman, founder of Peace by Chocolate
Max Haines, crime writer, columnist for the Toronto Sun
Edward Langille, university professor
Craig MacDonald, former professional hockey player
Garfield MacDonald, Olympic Athlete
Shauna MacDonald, actress, also known as "Promo Girl" on CBC Radio One
Allan MacEachen, Liberal MP, cabinet minister, Senator
Ryan MacGrath, musician and painter
Al MacIsaac, Vice President Chicago Blackhawks
Paul MacLean, former head coach of the Ottawa Senators and current assistant coach of the Toronto Maple Leafs
Carole MacNeil, television journalist, former co-host of CBC News: Sunday and CBC News: Sunday Night
Stephen McHattie, stage, film and TV actor
Robyn Meagher, Olympic runner
Carroll Morgan, Olympic heavyweight boxer
Archbishop James Morrison, Catholic Bishop 1912
Aleixo Muise, medical researcher and physician
Anne Simpson, poet
Ian Rankin, Canadian politician
Sandy Silver, Premier, Yukon
Wendell Smith, actor
Lewis John Stringer, Cross of Valour (Canada) Recipient, Wall of Valour
The Trews, a rock band

Climate

Antigonish experiences a humid continental climate (Köppen Dfb), with warm, humid summers and cold, snowy winters.

Gallery

See also
 List of municipalities in Nova Scotia

Notes

References

Sources

External links

Town of Antigonish

 
Populated coastal places in Canada
Populated places established in 1784
Towns in Nova Scotia